Somporn Yos (born 23 June 1993) is a Thai professional footballer who plays as a goalkeeper.

International career

Somporn won the 2015 Southeast Asian Games with Thailand U23. In 2016 Somporn was selected in Thailand U23 squad for 2016 AFC U-23 Championship in Qatar. In May 2016, he played for Thailand in the 2018 FIFA World Cup qualification (AFC) against Iraq.

Honours

International
Thailand U-23
 Sea Games Gold Medal: 2015
 BIDC Cup (Cambodia): 2013

External links

1993 births
Living people
Somporn Yos
Somporn Yos
Association football goalkeepers
Somporn Yos
Somporn Yos
Somporn Yos
Somporn Yos
Somporn Yos
Somporn Yos
Somporn Yos
Somporn Yos
Somporn Yos
Somporn Yos
Southeast Asian Games medalists in football
Competitors at the 2015 Southeast Asian Games